Barong dance is a style of traditional Balinese from Bali, Indonesia. The dance demonstrates about the mythological depiction of animals that have supernatural powers and could protect humans. Barong is the king of the spirits, leader of the hosts of good, and enemy of Rangda, the demon queen and mother of all spirit guarders in the mythological traditions of Bali. The Barong dance featured battle between Barong and Rangda to represent the eternal battle between good and evil.

Balinese Barong

The Barong is a type of mythical lion, which is a popular dance in Bali. The dance originated from the Gianyar region, where Ubud, the popular destination for tourist to watch Balinese dance ritual. Within the Calon Arang, the dance drama in which the Barong appears, the Barong responds to Rangda's use of magic to control and kill her to restore balance. In traditional Barong dance performances, he is portrayed in his struggles against Rangda, it is the popular part of Balinese culture. The mythical creature would dance along the street to the Calon Arang dance. A priest would throw holy water at it. The dance opens with two playful monkeys teasing Barong in a peaceful environment.

Keris dance
The next scene is popularly known as "Keris Dance". Balinese keris dance is part of Barong dance performance, in which the dancers wielded kris as weapon. This dance is considered sacred since it involved trance psychological condition.

The Rangda character appears and wreaks havoc. She casts black magic upon male dancers, who represent Airlangga's soldiers, and orders them to commit suicide. In a trance, these men stab themselves on their chest with their own kris. Meanwhile, Barong and the priest cast protective magic on these men, which makes them invulnerable to sharp objects. The kris dance is a thrilling performance when the tranced dancers stab themselves and showed their immunity to the keris stab.

Keris dance is actually a dangerous dance, since it can led to the fatal accident that may caused injury or death. In February 2021, a 16 years old boy keris dancer was stabbed to death right in his heart by his own kris in a trance, during a Rangda dance performance in Banjar Blong Gede, Pemecutan Kaja, Denpasar, Bali.

Barong versus Rangda
The dance ends with the final battle between Barong and Rangda, concluding with the victory of Barong over Rangda. Rangda runs away, the evil is defeated, and the celestial order is restored.

Other version

Javanese reog

It is held on special occasions such as the Lebaran (Eid al-Fitr), City or Regency anniversary, or Independence day carnival. He is credited with exceptional strength. The  may also carry an adolescent boy or girl on its head. When holding an adolescent boy or girl on his head, the Reog dancer holds the weight up to total 100 kilograms. The great mask that spans over 2.5 meters with genuine tiger or leopard skin and real peacock feathers. It has gained international recognition as the world's largest mask.

Chinese barongsai

Barongsai is referred to Chinese lion dance, often performed by Chinese Indonesian during Imlek. The barongsai has different forms that are distinct to the Balinese barong and Javanese reog, and it is not known if these have any relation to the Chinese lion.

See also

Balinese dance
Barong (mythology)
Dance in Indonesia

References

Dances of Bali
Dances of Java
Balinese culture
Javanese culture